Darshana TV is a Malayalam language free to air television channel based in Kozhikode, Kerala, India. It was launched on 1 January 2012. The channel was licensed on 21 June 2010 from the Indian Ministry of Information.

Darshana TV has its corporate office in Nadakkavu, Kozhikode. It is the first entity of its kind based in the Malabar region.

Available on Cable-  
Asianet Digital TV  (India)  - Channel 665

References

External links
 

Malayalam-language television channels
Television channels and stations established in 2012